WKND is a radio station, that operates on 1480 kHz, licensed to the city of Windsor, Connecticut. The transmitter site is in Windsor, while the studios are in Hartford. WKND is owned by Gois Broadcasting of Connecticut, LLC. WKND operates with 500 watts during the day and 14 watts at night. WKND airs an Urban AC format consisting of a mix of R&B hits and oldies, with gospel music airing on Sundays.

History
WKND signed on in 1961 as WSOR, and featured a country/western and Polish format. It was a 500-watt daytime-only station. After a couple sales of the station in the mid-1960s, WSOR became WEHW in 1966. In 1969, The KND Corporation purchased the station, and changed the callsign to WKND. A format change to R&B soon followed, and WKND became the first radio station in the state to feature a format targeting the African American community. In 1981, Hartcom Inc. purchased the station. Hartcom was formed by an all-minority group of individuals committed to keeping the station serving the African-American community. Studios eventually moved to the Windsor Parkade Shopping Center. Major transmitter site renovations were undertaken in the mid-1990s, with the replacement of the station's three towers and a retuning of the station's directional antenna pattern. In 2004, under an LMA with Freedom Communications of Connecticut, WKND's call sign and format moved to Freedom's WNEZ (1230 AM). With the move to 1230, WKND became a 24-hour station for the first time and got a power boost to 1,000 watts. They ran on-air announcements "The all-new 24 Hour, Twice the Power WKND 1230 AM". 1480 then took the WNEZ call letters from 1230 AM and became Urban Gospel-formatted "Heaven 1480" for a few months, and then became Spanish Oldies "La X 1480". WNEZ 1480 soon joined its sister stations WLAT and WKND at 330 Main Street in Hartford. Freedom Communications ended up in receivership, and in 2007, WKND and its R&B Oldies format reverted to 1480, with 1230 going back to WNEZ and a Spanish language format. Gois Broadcasting acquired WLAT and WNEZ in 2008 and WKND in 2009. The three stations were moved into new studios on Burnside Avenue in East Hartford shortly thereafter.

Translators

References

External links

KND
Radio stations established in 1961
1961 establishments in Connecticut
Urban adult contemporary radio stations in the United States